is a Japanese actress, gravure idol and race queen.

In a 2006 article on an "Air Guitar roadshow" in which Aizawa participated, the website cinematopics.com noted that she was the top idol of the gravure world. The website cinematopics.com interviewed Aizawa about her role in the film , which was based on a true disaster-survival story. In September 2009, Aizawa starred as the title character in a DVD version of the 1980s manga series, Miss Machiko. Advertising for the release made much of Aizawa's prominent bustline.

Works

DVDs 
 [2005.05.20] Hitomi no Naka
 [2005.08.26] H (ecchi)
 [2005.11.25] Best of You
 [200x.xx.xx] Hitomi wo Mitsumete
 [2006.02.20] I Zawa Hoshimi: Futari
 [2006.02.20] I Zawa Hoshimi: Kirei
 [2006.05.26] Hitomi Crisis!
 [200x.xx.xx] 青春ダイナミック 1,2,3

Photobooks 
 [2005.04.xx] I am I
 [2006.02.25] Hitomi Crisis!

Singles 
 [2006.07.26] Himitsu no Bonbaa (as OOPARTS)
 [2008.01.16] Hayaku Shiteyo

References

External links
 
  (Article & Interview with Aizawa on the film Open Water 2)

1982 births
Living people
People from Tokyo
Japanese gravure models
Japanese actresses
Japanese television personalities